Sinployea pitcairnensis is a species of land snail in the family Charopidae. It is endemic to Pitcairn.

References

P
Fauna of the Pitcairn Islands
Vulnerable fauna of Oceania
Molluscs of Oceania
Gastropods described in 1995
Taxonomy articles created by Polbot